The Twelfth Street Industrial Historic District in Lynchburg, Virginia is a historic district which was listed on the National Register of Historic Places in 2018.

The area contains industrial buildings including tobacco warehouses and a commercial laundry. The area was also home to a school for African Americans and a Lodge. In 2018, plans for the historic designation and redevelopment of one of the buildings as lofts were proposed. It is Lynchburg's 11th historic district.

See also
National Register of Historic Places listings in Lynchburg, Virginia

References

Historic districts in Lynchburg, Virginia
Buildings and structures in Lynchburg, Virginia
National Register of Historic Places in Lynchburg, Virginia
Historic districts on the National Register of Historic Places in Virginia